Andasibe is a town and commune in Madagascar. It belongs to the district of Vavatenina, which is a part of Analanjirofo Region. The population of the commune was estimated to be approximately 25,831 in 2018.

The commune is divided in 11 fokontany in 116 villages. It is situated at 29 km from Vavatenina, of which are 17 km on the RN22 and 12 km of unpaved roads.

Rivers
Maningory River

References and notes 

Populated places in Analanjirofo